Sam Tutty (born 9 April 1998) is an English actor. He is most known for his title role in the West End production of the musical Dear Evan Hansen for which a then 22-year-old Tutty won a 2020 Laurence Olivier Award for Best Actor in a Leading Role in a Musical, becoming one of the youngest winners of the award. In 2021, he joined the cast of the Channel 4 soap opera Hollyoaks as Timmy Simons.

Early life and education 
Sam Tutty was born on 9 April 1998 in Crawley, West Sussex. His father left when he was ten years old and he, his mother, and younger brother soon moved to Hull. After returning to West Sussex, Tutty attended Imberhorne Secondary School, notably appearing in many school productions such as The Wizard of Oz. Tutty attended the Italia Conti Academy of Theatre Arts, where he learned to dance, amassed his repertoire of songs, and gained his foundation in theatre etiquette.

Acting career 
Tutty made his off-West End debut as Daniel in the British Theater Academy's production of Once on This Island at the Southwark Playhouse. After an intensive auditions process in which he was originally cast as Evan's alternate, Tutty was cast as the main Evan Hansen in the West End production of Dear Evan Hansen at the Noel Coward Theatre. Previews for the show began on 29 October 2019 and the show officially opened on 19 November 2019. Tutty's performance gained widespread praise from critics. He went on to receive numerous awards, including Laurence Olivier Award for Best Actor in a Musical in 2020. At age 22, he is one of the youngest winners of the most prestigious UK theatrical award.

On 25 May 2021, it was announced that Tutty had joined the cast of the Channel 4 soap opera Hollyoaks. He made his debut appearance as Timmy Simons on 4 June 2021. After 21 episodes, the character was killed off to allow Tutty to reprise his role of Evan Hansen after the re-opening of the West End production in October 2021 following the forced closure due to the COVID-19 pandemic.  In 2022 Tutty performed the song "Heart Of A Stranger" for The Robbie Sherman Songbook.

Theatre credits

Filmography

Accolades

See also 
 List of British actors

References

External links
 

1998 births
21st-century English male actors
Alumni of the Italia Conti Academy of Theatre Arts
English male musical theatre actors
English male soap opera actors
Laurence Olivier Award winners
Living people
Male actors from Kingston upon Hull
People from Crawley